The Forbes list of Australia's 50 richest people is the annual survey of the fifty wealthiest people resident in Australia, published by Forbes Asia in January 2016. 

The net worth of the wealthiest individual, Blair Parry-Okeden, was estimated to be 8.80 billion. It was the first and only time that Parry-Okeden appeared on the Forbes Australian list. She is a US-citizen and, despite living in Australia, is not eligible for admission on the list.

List of individuals

See also
 Financial Review Rich List
 Forbes list of Australia's 50 richest people

References

2016 in Australia
2016